Mountain Fire Lookout Tower is a fire lookout tower in Oconto County, Wisconsin, United States.

It is the eighth property featured in a program of the National Park Service that began in July, 2008.

It is located on Forest Service Rd. 2335 (Tower Rd.), Lakewood Ranger District, Nicolet National Forest, in Riverview, Wisconsin.

It was listed on the National Register of Historic Places on August 19, 2008.

References

Government buildings completed in 1935
Towers completed in 1935
Buildings and structures in Oconto County, Wisconsin
Fire lookout towers in Wisconsin
Fire lookout towers on the National Register of Historic Places
Park buildings and structures on the National Register of Historic Places in Wisconsin
National Register of Historic Places in Oconto County, Wisconsin